Ja-Ela is a suburb of Colombo, located approximately  north of the Colombo city centre. Ja-Ela lies on the A3 road which overlaps with the Colombo – Katunayake Expressway at the Ja-Ela Interchange.

Etymology 

The etymology of the name is uncertain, and there are several yet arguable interpretations of the name. Howbeit, based on verified historical shreds of evidence, the etymology of the place, Ja Ela is based on both Malay and Sinhala languages.  "Ja" and "Javan" are referential terms used by the Sinhalese, Moors & Tamils to address the Malays/Javanese or those of Indonesian descent and the term "Ela" is derived from Sinhala language meaning stream, lake or canal.

Local government council
Ja-Ela is administered by the Ja-Ela Urban Council.

Populations 
32,175

Demographics 
Majority of the people from Ja-Ela are generally Sinhalese, along with other minority communities such as Tamils, Muslims and Burghers.

The following table summarises the population of Ja-Ela DS Area which covers both urban sectors and rural sectors,  according to ethnicity (2011 Census)

Source: Department of Census and Statistics, 2012

Transport 
This suburb is situated on the main road A3, between Colombo municipality and Negombo municipality. Ja-Ela is situated very close to the Bandaranaike International Airport. There is also a bus stand in Ja-Ela which provides access to Colombo, Negombo, Gampaha. The traffic issues at Ja-Ela have been reduced after the introduction of the Colombo – Katunayake Expressway, which serves an interchange at Ja-Ela.

Railway
The Ja-Ela railway station is located on the Puttalam line and was opened in 1908. The station provides commuter access to the Colombo, Putlam and Chilaw areas. Not only the station is in the heart of the Ja- Ela town and also it is the nearest station to the Negombo - Colombo Main road. Therefore, it known as one of the most popular stations in the area.

Schools 
 King's International College - Kapuwatta

Geography

Climate

References 

 
Populated places in Gampaha District